Hostiles may refer to:

Hostiles (film), a 2017 film 
Hostiles (Lost), a group of characters in the television series Lost
 One of the classes in the North Korean Songbun system

See also
Hostile (disambiguation)